Bear Creek School may refer to:

 The Bear Creek School, Washington, United States
 Bear Creek High School (California), Stockton, United States
 Bear Creek High School (Colorado), Lakewood, United States
 Bear Creek Secondary School, Ontario, Canada